Quixabeira is a municipality in the state of Bahia in the North-East region of Brazil. With 8,956 inhabitants of estimated population, borders with five other municipalities: Jacobina, Capim Grosso, São José do Jacuípe, Várzea da Roça and Serrolândia.

See also
List of municipalities in Bahia

References

Municipalities in Bahia